Işıktepe can refer to:

 Işıktepe, Maden
 Işıktepe, Toroslar